The Overseas radio reception center Lüchow was one of the large radio reception centers of the German Federal Post Office for civil telecommunications use between 1948 and 1987. It was used to handle teletype, telegram and telephone services worldwide via shortwave radio.

History 
Until 1932, all overseas radio links were operated by the radio operating company Transradio. The main radio stations of this company were the Nauen Transmitter Station and the receiving radio station Beelitz near Berlin.
Because of the growing overseas radio traffic, the Reichspostzentralamt at that time felt compelled to start planning work for a new receiving station in 1937. Various areas were examined for suitability during the planning phase. There were several conditions involved: far away from sources of interference of any kind (industry, high-voltage systems, large settlements, etc.) and the best possible soil conductivity. The choice fell on swampy terrain in Wendland, east of the city of Lüchow, a little north of the village of Woltersdorf and far away from larger settlements. A total of approx.  was acquired. The site got partially dehydrated by the Luciekanal to Jeetzel river.
Construction of the station building began in 1938/39; they were completed in 1942. The radio equipment, including the antennas, was supplied by Telefunken and set up in the years up to 1944. In December 1944, the receiving radio station officially went into operation. During the years up to 1947, the site was not used as an operating point for civil radio communications due to the war restrictions.

The operation

Radio operation 
It was until the end of 1947 that the originally planned civil use as an overseas radio station began with the opening of the first telephony radio line Hamburg - Rio de Janeiro. It was followed by the line to Buenos Aires in May 1948. At the end of 1948 there were already seven fixed radio lines overseas and the first European connections to Lisbon and Barcelona had gone into operation. The majority of the connections were telegraph connections in which the transmission of telegrams was carried out manually using Morse code radio. Until 1951 this was an additional task  to the actual tasks of the maritime radio operated at the coastal radio station Norddeich Radio (Radio call sign was DAN).

Telegram service 
From 1950 there were a total of 24 fixed radio lines, including to Ankara, Bangkok, Bombay, Buenos Aires, Cairo, Calcutta, Lima, Manila, Osaka and Seoul. At that time, an impressive 12,000-14,000 wireless telegrams were processed every month. To get an idea of the qualifications of the radio operators, a 32-word telegram can be heard here as an example. The telegrams had to be recorded without errors and when they were recorded they had to be written immediately with a typewriter or telex for transmission to the telegraph office in Hamburg. Not an easy task with a character speed of 125 characters / minute and reception impairments due to fading and background noise.

The example takes only about 90 seconds. However, one shift lasted eight hours, including short breaks. The quality of the telegram recording should not decrease in the course of a shift. This not only required a lot of practice, but also a special talent. In addition to the telegram acceptance, telegrams were also sent. The characters were given by hand with a Morse key at the same pace. Because of its precision, the Junker MT Morse key was mostly used. Most of the radio operators previously worked on ships or at a coast radio station.
In 1952, the last Morse telegraphy connections to Rio and Lima were switched to radio telex and the highly qualified radio operators required until then were no longer necessary. The total number of radio lines rose to over 40 by 1953.

The end of the short-wave transmission 
Before the closure of the sister station ÜEFuSt Eschborn near Frankfurt at the end of 1969, Lüchow took over the last eight lines from there. This then resulted in 33 connections with a total of 8 telephone channels and 119 telex channels.
Since the beginning of the 1970s, shortwave radio has increasingly lost its importance due to the advancing global networking with overseas cable and satellite connections. At the end of 1973 there were only 20 lines in Lüchow and in 1986 only one telex connection to Kabul/ Afghanistan. This was finally shut down in the same year as the last connection and thus the operation finally stopped.

Radio weather observation 
In addition to the reception service for the telephone and telex lines, a radio weather observation center was set up in 1966. At that time it took over the tasks from the position at Detmold. The collected radio weather data was passed on from here to the Central Telecommunications Office at Darmstadt and there combined with the data from other offices to form a radio weather forecast. On end of the 1970s this service at Lüchow was given up for cost reasons and relocated to the evaluation center at Darmstadt.

Operating modes 
 A1 Morse code in hand recording for transmission of telegrams
 A1A Morse code machine transmission
 F1 telex transmission, 1 channel
 F6 / F6A telegraph transmission, WTK with 2, 4 or 8 channels (WTK = alternating current telegraph device for shortwave radio links)
 A3J telephony single sideband
 A7A Teletype MUX single sideband with reduced carrier
 A9B transmission of broadcasts with different sidebands and reduced carrier (telephony / telex)

Equipment park

Antennas 

It started in 1949 with 3 horizontal dipoles, 13 large rhombuses for the frequency range from 6 to 26 MHz and one omnidirectional antenna. In 1950 the antenna park was expanded to include 8 dipoles, 17 rhombuses and a cross frame antenna for long waves. In 1952 another 9 rhombs followed. In the final stage, a total of 44 antennas were in operation. The associated antenna distributor ("antenna station") was housed in a circular extension to the reception hall. The floor was decorated with a compass rose, the orientation of which was roughly based on the assignment of the distributor with the antennas. The distributor was designed for the distribution of up to 100 antennas to 120 receivers. The rhombuses had a design frequency of 18 MHz with a gain of approx. 20 dB. For each direction there were two antennas with a distance of several wavelengths in the receiving direction, so that they could be used for a diversity-receiving. A specialty was the interconnection of two rhombs (antennas 25 and 26 in the direction of 232 °) in a test arrangement by Telefunken to form a MUSA ( Multiple Unit Steerable Antenna) according to an invention by Harald T. Friis. The experiment was terminated for economic reasons, the antennas remained on site for further use.

The antennas with targets and distances

Receivers 
In 1948 the equipment consisted of 30 Telefunken E459 large station receivers and was constantly expanded and renewed. In 1969, 77 receivers were installed:
	1 Telefunken long wave receiver EST 108 LW / R
	7 × 2 Telefunken diversity receivers EST 305 KW 
	9 × 2 Siemens diversity receivers 2 KW 1/3
	8 Telefunken single sideband receivers EST304KW
	8 Siemens single sideband receivers KW 2/6
	8 × 2 Siemens double diversity receivers Funk 125E101a
	5 × 2 Siemens double diversity receivers Funk 125E103b
In the late 1970s, the first fully transistorized receivers were added with six Telefunken E1501 receivers.

Subsequent use 

From 1979 the area was also used by the Lower Saxony police who were deployed in the protests against the nearby Gorleben nuclear waste storage facility and the Castor transports. After renovation work, these initially occupied some of the ÜFESt rooms. Later, additional container buildings were built in the outdoor area, which offered accommodation for up to 1000 emergency services. In the summer of 2005, the residential containers were destroyed by a major fire. During the refugee crisis in Germany in 2015/ 2016, the area served as emergency accommodation for several hundred refugees. During this time, there were other smaller fires. The subsequent use as refugee accommodation ended on September 30, 2016.

Literature 
	Ernst Bornemann: Bridge to the World: The Overseas Radio Receiving Center Lüchow-Woltersdorf. A chronicle from 1938 to 1988 . 1st edition. Projekt-Verlag Cornelius, 2008,  (in German).

References

External links 
 
 
 This article was entirely translated from the corresponding article in the German Wikipedia titled "Übersee-Funkempfangsstelle Lüchow " .

History of telecommunications in Germany
Radio in Germany
Contemporary German history
Buildings and structures in Lower Saxony